"Entre tus alas" (English: "Between Your Wings") is a song by Mexican pop group Camila, released on February 5, 2011 as the four single from their second album, Dejarte de Amar (2010). "Entre tus alas" was written by Mario Domm, Paulyna Carraz and produced by Domm. The song reached number two on the US Billboard Latin Pop Airplay charts. This song is also performed a duet with American singer Colbie Caillat

Charts

Release history

See also
List of number-one songs of 2011 (Mexico)

References

2011 singles
Songs written by Mario Domm
Camila (band) songs
Monitor Latino Top General number-one singles
Spanish-language songs
Sony Music Latin singles
2010 songs